Nachipalayam is a small village located 5 km south of Vellakoil, Tiruppur district, Tamil Nadu, India. Power loom factories and spinning mills are the major livelihood for nearly 500 people.

References 

Villages under Vellakoil Police limit

Villages in Tiruppur district